Cabeçalinho is a settlement in the western part of the island of São Nicolau, Cape Verde. In 2010 its population was 155. It is situated 3 km southwest of Ribeira Brava and 6 km northeast of Tarrafal de São Nicolau. To its northwest is Monte Gordo.

See also
List of villages and settlements in Cape Verde

References

Villages and settlements in São Nicolau, Cape Verde
Tarrafal de São Nicolau